Oldchurch Hospital was a hospital in Greater London, United Kingdom, located in Romford in the London Borough of Havering and part of the Barking, Havering and Redbridge Hospitals NHS Trust.

History
The hospital has its origins in the infirmary built to support the Romford Union Workhouse in 1893. It served as a military hospital during the First World War and became the Oldchurch County Hospital in 1929. The name refers to Saint Andrew's Chapel, the "old church" of Romford that was replaced by the Church of St Edward the Confessor in 1410.

It joined the National Health Service in 1948. It closed in December 2006 with functions moved to the new, state of the art Queen's Hospital, located nearby and to King George Hospital in Chadwell Heath.

Notable births
Gemma Collins (born 1981), media personality and businesswoman

See also 
 Healthcare in London

References

 

NHS hospitals in London
Defunct hospitals in London
Former buildings and structures in the London Borough of Havering
Health in the London Borough of Havering
Romford
Hospitals established in 1838
1893 establishments in England
Residential buildings completed in 1838
Hospitals disestablished in 2006
2006 disestablishments in England